The University of Liège, or ULiège, is a major public university of the French Community of Belgium based in Liège, Wallonia, Belgium. Its official language is French. As of 2020, ULiège is ranked in the 301–350 category worldwide according to Times Higher Education, 451st by QS World University Rankings, and between the 201st and 300th place by the  Academic Ranking of World Universities.
More than 2,000 people, including academics, scientists and technicians, are involved in research of a wide variety of subjects from basic research to applied research.

History
The university was founded in 1817 by William I of the Netherlands, then King of the United Kingdom of the Netherlands, and by his Minister of Education, Anton Reinhard Falck. The foundation of the university was the result of a long intellectual tradition which dates back to the origins of the Prince-Bishopric of Liège. Beginning in the eleventh century, the influence of the principality attracted students and prominent scientists and philosophers, such as Petrarch, to study in its libraries. The reputation of its medieval schools gave the city the reputation as a new Athens.

A 17 March 1808 decree by Napoleon I concerning the organization of an imperial university indicated Liège as the site of a new academy to be composed of a Faculty of Arts and a Faculty of Science—the first university charter for Liège. Ultimately, Liège owes its university to William I of the Netherlands, who remembered the city's prestigious legacy of teaching and culture when he decided to establish a new university on Walloon soil.

Nearly 200 years later, settled to some extent in the  district of Liège, the University of Liège belongs to the French community of Belgium. The university is located at the edge of the river Meuse, in the center of the Island, the Latin Quarter of Liège. In 2009, the Agronomical University of Gembloux (FUSAGx), based in Gembloux, in the Province of Namur, integrated ULiège. It has adopted a new name for academics as well as research, namely Gembloux Agro-Bio Tech.

Chronology 

 1817: foundation of the University of Liege by William I of the Netherlands.
 1838: opening of the Liège mining school.
 1881: first female student.
 1882: beginning of the construction of the Trasenster Institutes in Liège:
 1882: Institute of Astrophysics and the Cointe Observatory;
 1883: Institute of Pharmacy, the Botanical Institute and the Montefiore Institute of Electrical Engineering;
 1885: the Auguste Swaen Institute of Anatomy;
 1888: Institutes of Physiology, of Zoology and of Chemistry.
 1955: foundation of the University of Lubumbashi (called Elisabethville at the time) by the State University of Liège.
 1967: beginning of the transfer process from the city center to the Sart Tilman campus.
 1969: the Cureghem University of Veterinary Medicine in Brussels is administratively attached to ULiège.
 1989: the State University of Liège becomes a university of the French Community of Belgium.
 1991: The Faculty of Veterinary Medicine is transferred from Brussels to the Sart Tilman campus.
 2004: The Fondation universitaire luxembourgeoise integrates the University of Liège, creating the Faculty of Science's Department of Environmental Science and Management.
 2005: HEC Liège (Management School) and the Department of Economics and Business Administration of the University of Liège merge to create the HEC Liège – School of Management of the University of Liège business school ;
 2009: The University of Agricultural Sciences of Gembloux (FUSAGx) in Gembloux is integrated into the University of Liège, becoming an independent faculty under the name Gembloux Agro-Bio Tech.
 2010: Through the merger of the Institut supérieur d'architecture Saint-Luc de Liège (ISA Saint-Luc Liège) and the Institut supérieur d'architecture Lambert Lombard (ISAI LL), a new faculty is created within ULiège: the Faculty of Architecture.
 2015: the Institute of Human and Social Sciences (ISHS) becomes an independent faculty: the Faculty of Social Sciences (FaSS)
2021: The Department of Media, Culture and Communication of the Faculty of Philosophy and Letters establishes its school of journalism, with various auditoriums, classrooms and studios in the renovated Grand Poste de Liège; named Media Campus, these facilities are located in front of the historical faculty buildings. The student radio station 48FM is also relocating there.

Organisation

The rector of ULiège is Professor Pierre Wolper, who succeeded Professor Albert Corhay in 2014.  Anne Girin has been the university's Administrator since September 1, 2020. She replaced Laurent Despy and became the first woman to hold this position.

The University of Liège counts:
 24,522 students
 4,600 foreign students
 4,300 employees
 2,800 faculty members (both teaching and research)
 1,300 administrative and technical support staff

ULiège comprises 11 faculties:
Faculty of Philosophy and Letters
Faculty of Law, Political Science and Criminology
The Jean Constant Graduate School of Criminology
Faculty of Social Science
 Faculty of Science
Faculty of Applied Science
 Faculty of Medicine
 Faculty of Veterinary Medicine
Gembloux Agro-Bio Tech – Faculty of Agronomical Science and Bioengineering
 Faculty of Psychology, Logopedics and Educational Sciences
 Faculty of Architecture
HEC Liège Management School

Campus 
Since the 1970s, ULiège's main campus has been the  hill, a vast planned community campus located about ten kilometers south from the center of Liège. However, the university has kept its headquarters and many administrative facilities in the city centre, as well as the Faculty of Philosophy and Letters, the Institutes of Zoology, Anatomy, the HEC Liège Management School and the newly incorporated Faculty of Architecture.

The Gembloux Agro-Bio Tech campus and faculty are located in the city of Gembloux, Namur Province, and Faculty of Science Department of Environmental Science and Management is located in Arlon, Luxembourg Province.

The university also owns a scientific research station in the Belgian High Fens since 1924, the STARESO oceanography station in Calvi, Corsica, France, a meteorological station and the Sphinx Observatory on the Jungfraujoch, Switzerland, since 1950 and research stations and observatories in Chile (SPECULOOS and TRAPPIST-South), Morocco and Tenerife, Spain (TRAPPIST-North).

Notable alumni
For full list, see University of Liège alumni.
 Joaquín Arderíus, novelist
 Philippe Bodson, engineer
 Albert Claude, Nobel Prize for Physiology or Medicine in 1974
 Marie Delcourt, first female professor at the ULiège
 Marcel Detienne, philosophy and literature (PhD)
 Paul Demaret, rector of the College of Europe
 Jacques H. Drèze, economist
 Paul Fredericq (1850–1920), historian
 Michel A. J. Georges, veterinary, 2008 Francqui Prize
 Jean Gol (1942–1995), lawyer, politician
 Alexis Jacquemin (1938–2004), economy, 1983 Francqui Prize on Human Sciences
 David Keilin, entomologist
 Auguste Kerckhoffs, Dutch linguist and cryptographer
 Jean-Marie Klinkenberg, linguist and semiotician
 Jan Kowalewski, Polish cryptologist
 Wincenty Kowalski, Polish military commander
 Marc Lacroix (1963-  ), biochemist
 Joseph Lebeau, statesman
 Jean-Christophe Marine, biologist
 Marcel Nicolet, Belgian physicist and meteorologist
 Jean-Baptiste Nothomb, statesman and diplomat
 Stanisław Olszewski, Polish engineer and inventor
 Paul Pastur, lawyer and politician (1866–1938)
 Joseph Plateau (1801–1883), physicist
 Georges Poulet, literary critic
 Guy Quaden, economist, Governor of the National Bank of Belgium
 Jean Rey (1902–1983), second President of the European Commission
 Max Rooses, writer
 Léon Rosenfeld, physicist
 Philippe-Charles Schmerling, pioneer in paleontology
 Theodor Schwann, developer of cell theory and discoverer of Schwann cells
 Polidor Swings, 1948 laureate of the Francqui Prize
 Haroun Tazieff, French vulcanologist and geologist
 André Henri Constant van Hasselt, poet

Notable faculty
 Zénon-M. Bacq (1903–1983), radiobiologist
 Florent-Joseph Bureau (1906–1999), mathematician
 Eugène Charles Catalan, mathematician
 André Danthine, computer scientist
 Marcel Florkin (1900–1979), medicine, biochemistry
 Laurent-Guillaume de Koninck (1809–1887), palaeontologist and chemist
 Émile Louis Victor de Laveleye, economist
 Marie Delcourt (1891–1979), classical philologist
 Philippe Devaux (1902–1979), philosopher
 Paul Fourmarier (1877–1970), geologist
 Paul Gochet (1932), philosopher
 Groupe µ, Group of semioticians
 Godefroid Kurth (1847–1916), historian
 Paul Ledoux (1914–1988), astrophysicist
 Jean-Pierre Nuel (1847–1920), physiologist
 Pol Swings (1906–1983), astrophysicist
 Edouard Van Beneden (1846–1910), biologist
 Theodor Schwann (1810–1882), biologist

Honorary doctorate
 Salman Rushdie (September 1999)
 Dominique Strauss-Kahn (May 2011)
 Mikhail Gorbachev (2011)
 Bill Viola (2010)

See also
 Academia Belgica
 Belgian Academy Council of Applied Sciences
 BioLiège
 Cointe Observatory
 Francqui Foundation
 Liège Science Park
 List of modern universities in Europe (1801–1945)
 National Fund for Scientific Research
 Open access in Belgium
 Science and technology in Wallonia
 Science Parks of Wallonia
 Top Industrial Managers for Europe (TIME) network for student mobility
 TRAPPIST, a telescope operated since 2010
 University Foundation

Notes and references

External links

 
 ULiège's WebTV
 International Conference on System Simulation in Buildings held in ULiège

 
Public universities
Educational institutions established in 1817
Buildings and structures in Liège
Engineering universities and colleges in Belgium
1817 establishments in Europe
1817 establishments in the Netherlands
William I of the Netherlands
Universities and colleges formed by merger in Belgium